Gyan Bahadur Bohara (born 29 May 1969) is a Nepalese long-distance runner. He competed in the men's 5000 metres at the 2000 Summer Olympics.

References

External links
 

1969 births
Living people
Athletes (track and field) at the 2000 Summer Olympics
Nepalese male long-distance runners
Olympic athletes of Nepal
Place of birth missing (living people)
Athletes (track and field) at the 1998 Asian Games
Asian Games competitors for Nepal
20th-century Nepalese people